Ling-Chi Wang is a Chinese-born American civil rights activist and ethnologist. He is a civil rights activist and Professor Emeritus of Asian-American studies and ethnic studies at the University of California, Berkeley. He has been called the "Asian Martin Luther King" for his four decades of activism. Wang was born in Xiamen, Fujian, China, in 1938 and emigrated to the United States in 1957 at the age of 19.

He received a master's degree in Near Eastern studies from the University of Chicago. However, as a response to the Civil Rights Movement in the 1960s, Wang switched his interests to Asian American studies.

In response to the Wen Ho Lee spying allegations, Wang and an Asian American academic organization instituted a boycott of the two labs run by the University of California, in Lawrence Livermore National Laboratory and Los Alamos National Laboratory in New Mexico. He also helped organize a class-action lawsuit against the labs in response to racial profiling allegations.

Wang led a movement that exposed the involvement of the Taiwan government's role in the murder of Henry Liu in Daly City, California by Bamboo Union agents.

See also
 Henry Liu

References

1938 births
Living people
American ethnologists
Chinese emigrants to the United States
East Asian studies scholars
People from Xiamen
UC Berkeley College of Letters and Science alumni
University of California, Berkeley faculty
University of Chicago alumni
American civil rights activists
Asian-American movement activists